Secrets of the Dead, produced by WNET 13 New York, is an ongoing PBS television series which began in 2000. The show generally follows an investigator or team of investigators exploring what modern science can tell us about some of the great mysteries of history. Most programs incorporate primary source material, first-hand accounts, dramatic reenactments, and computer-generated imagery (CGI) to tell the story. The series originated in a series of the same name in the United Kingdom first shown by Channel 4 in 1999. The first two seasons for each country were broadly similar, but thereafter diverged. The US series includes some programs shown in other Channel 4 series (e.g. Secret History). In the case of original British episodes, PBS re-edited, re-branded and finally re-narrated them with various American voice artists. PBS description: "Scientists seek to uncover celebrated mysteries of the past in this occasional British series."

Episode topics have included the Titanic, D-Day, the Shroud of Turin, the Salem Witch Trials, Blackbeard's lost ship, and the first English translations of the Bible.

The PBS series premiered on May 15, 2000, airing four programs in three days (the first episode, concerning the Extreme weather events of 535–536, was a two-parter). Despite an irregular schedule, new episodes continue to air.

Episodes — UK series

Season 1 (1999)
Ep. 1: "Blood Red Roses" (1999-06-29 — US S4#1)
Ep. 2: "What Happened to the Hindenburg?" (1999-07-06 — US S1#4)
Ep. 3: "The Lost Vikings" (1999-07-13 — US S1#3)
Ep. 4: "Cannibals of the Canyon" (1999-07-20 — US S1#5 "Cannibalism in the Canyon")
Ep. 5: "Catastrophe – The Day the Sun Went Out" (1999-07-27 — US S1#1)
Ep. 6: "Catastrophe – How the World Changed" (1999-08-03 — US S1#2)

Season 2 (2000)
Ep. 1: "Murder at Stonehenge" (2000-07-17 — US S2#2)
Ep. 2: "The Syphilis Enigma" (2000-07-24 — US S2#6)
Ep. 3: "Murder in Jamestown" (2000-07-31 — US S2#3 "Death at Jamestown")
Ep. 4: "Bewitched" (2000-08-07 — US S2#1 "Witches Curse")
Ep. 5: "Blood on the Altar" (2000-08-14)
Ep. 6: "What Sank the Mary Rose?" (2000-08-21)

Season 3 (2001)
Ep. 1: "The Riddle of Pompeii" (2001-02-01)
Ep. 2: "The Hidden Scrolls of Herculaneum" (2001-02-08)
Ep. 3: "Gladiator Girl" (2001-05-14)
Ep. 4: "Sounds from the Stone Age" (2001-11-12)
Ep. 5: "The First Human?" (2001-11-19 — US S3#1 "Search for the First Human")
Ep. 6: "Mystery of Zulu Dawn" (2001-12-03 — US S2#4 "Day of the Zulu")
Ep. 7: "Who Burnt Rome?" (2001-12-10 — US S3#4 "The Great Fire of Rome")
Ep. 8: "King Midas's Feast" (2001-12-30)

Season 4 (2002)
Ep. 1: "Riddle of the Plague Survivors" (2002-02-24)
Ep. 2: "The Birth of the Smart Bomber" (2002-03-03)
Ep. 3: "Quest for Noah's Flood" (2002-03-16)

Season 5 (2003–04)
Ep. 1: "Titanic's Ghost" (2003-03-13 — US S3#3)
Ep. 2: "The Coldest March" (2003-03-20 — US S3#5 "Tragedy at the Pole")
Ep. 3: "Plague on the Western Front" (2003-03-27)
Ep. 4: "Shroud of Christ?" (2004-03-29 — US S4#4)

Episodes — US series

Season 1 (2000)
Ep. 1: "Catastrophe! – The Day the Sun Went Out” Part 1 of 2 (2000-05-15 — UK S1#5) — narrated by Roy Scheider
Ep. 2: "Catastrophe! – How the World Changed” Part 2 of 2 (2000-05-16 — UK S1#6) — narrated by Roy Scheider
Ep. 3: "The Lost Vikings" (2000-05-16 — UK S1#3)
Ep. 4: "What Happened to the Hindenburg?" (2000-05-17 — UK S1#2)
Ep. 5: "Cannibalism in the Canyon" (2000-05-17 — UK S1#4 "Cannibals of the Canyon")

This season was released on VHS on August 1, 2000.

Season 2 (2001)
Ep. 1: "Witches Curse" (2001-06-26 — UK S2#4 "Bewitched")
Ep. 2: "Murder at Stonehenge" (2001-07-03 — UK S2#1)
Ep. 3: "Death at Jamestown" (2001-07-10 — UK S2#3 "Murder in Jamestown")
Ep. 4: "Day of the Zulu" (2001-07-17 — UK S3#6 "Mystery of Zulu Dawn")
Ep. 5: "Tomb of Christ" (2001-07-24)
Ep. 6: "The Syphilis Enigma" (2001-07-31 — UK S2#2)

This season was released on VHS on July 31, 2001.

Season 3 (2002–03)
Ep. 1: "Search for the First Human" (2002-05-08 — UK S3#5 "The First Human?")
Ep. 2: "Mystery of the Black Death" (2002-10-30)
Ep. 3: "Titanic's Ghosts" (2002-11-20 — UK S5#1)
Ep. 4: "The Great Fire of Rome" (2002-11-27 — UK S3#7 "Who Burnt Rome?")
Ep. 5: "Tragedy at the Pole" (2003-01-15 — UK S5#2)
Ep. 6: "Bombing Nazi Dams" (2003-02-12)

This season was released on VHS on December 3, 2002 and February 25, 2003.

Season 4 (2003–04)
Ep. 1: "Blood Red Roses" (2003-11-01 — UK S1#1)
Ep. 2: "Bridge on the River Kwai" (2003-11-12) [2003-11-18 VHS]
Ep. 3: "Killer Flu" (2004-03-03 — UK Secret History S6#5) [2004-03-02 VHS]
Ep. 4: "Shroud of Christ?" (2004-04-07 — UK S5#4) [2004-04-06 VHS]
Ep. 5: "D-Day" (2004-05-19) [2004-10-26 VHS]
Ep. 6: "Amazon Warrior Women" (2004-08-04) [2004-08-24 VHS]

Season 5 (2005–06)
Ep. 1: "The Hunt for Nazi Scientists" (2005-10-19) [2005-10-18 DVD/VHS]
Ep. 2: "Gangland Graveyard" (2005-11-16) [2006-01-03 DVD/VHS]
Ep. 3: "Voyage of the Courtesans" (2005-11-23) [2005-11-22 VHS; 2006-01-03 DVD]
Ep. 4: "The Sinking of the Andrea Doria" (2006-07-26) [2006-09-19 DVD/Video]
Ep. 5: "Umbrella Assassin" (2006-10-04) [2006-11-14 DVD]

Season 6 (2006–07)
Ep. 1: "Dogfight Over Guadalcanal" (2006-11-08)
Ep. 2: "Battle for the Bible" (2007-04-25, #602)
Ep. 3: "Herculaneum Uncovered" (2007-05-02, #603)
Ep. 4: "Headless Romans" (2007-05-09, #604)
Ep. 5: "Irish Escape" (2007-05-16, #605)

Season 7 (2008)
Ep. 1: "Aztec Massacre"  (2008-04-23, #701)
Ep. 2: "Escape from Auschwitz" (2008-04-30, #702)

Season 8 (2008–09)
Ep. 1: "Doping for Gold" (2008-05-07, #801)
Ep. 2: "Sinking Atlantis" (2008-05-14, #802)
Ep. 3: "Executed in Error" (2008-10-01, #803)
Ep. 4: "Blackbeard's Lost Ship" (2009-04-22, #804)

Season 9 (2009–2010)
Ep. 1: "Michelangelo Revealed" (2009-05-13, #901)
Ep. 2: "The Airmen and the Headhunters" (2009-11-11, #902)
Ep. 3: "Mumbai Massacre" (2009-11-25, #903)
Ep. 4: "Japanese SuperSub" (2010-05-05, #904)

Season 10 (2010)
Ep. 1: "Churchill's Deadly Decision" (2010-05-12, #1001)
Ep. 2: "Deadliest Battle" (2010-05-19, #1002)
Ep. 3: "The Silver Pharaoh" (2010-11-03, #1003)
Ep. 4: "Slave Ship Mutiny" (2010-11-10, #1004)

Season 11 (2010–11)
Ep. 1: "Lost Ships of Rome" (2010-11-17, #1101)
Ep. 2: "Lost in the Amazon" (2011-04-20, #1102)
Ep. 3: "China's Terracotta Warriors" (2011-05-04, #1103)
Ep. 4: "The World's Biggest Bomb" (2011-05-18, #1104)

Season 12 (2012–13)
Ep. 1: "The Man Who Saved the World" (2012-10-24, #1201)Soviet Navy officer Vasily Arkhipov's actions during the Cuban Missile Crisis.
Ep. 2: "Bugging Hitler's Soldiers" (2013-05-01, #1202)
Ep. 3: "Death on the Railroad" (2013-05-08, #1203)
Ep. 4: "Caveman Cold Case" (2013-05-15, #1204) — narrated by Jay O. Sanders
Ep. 5: "Ultimate Tut" (2013-07-10, #1205) — 2-hour episode narrated by Jay O. Sanders
Ep. 6: "Bones of the Buddha" (2013-07-23, #1206) — host explorer Charles Allen, narrated by Jay O. Sanders (Charles Dance in the UK version)

Season 13 (2013–14)
Ep. 1: "JFK: One PM Central Standard Time" (2013-11-13, #1301) — narrated by George Clooney
Ep. 2: "The Lost Diary of Dr. Livingstone" (2014-03-26, #1302)
Ep. 3: "Carthage's Lost Warriors" (2014-04-02, #1303)
Ep. 4: "The Lost Gardens of Babylon" (2014-05-06, #1304)
Ep. 5: "The Mona Lisa Mystery" (2014-07-09, #1305) — written and directed by Klaus T. SteindlExperts examine the controversy over whether the Isleworth Mona Lisa was painted by Leonardo da Vinci
Ep. 6: "Dick Cavett's Watergate" (2014-08-08)
Ep. 7: "Resurrecting Richard III" (2014-09-24, #1306)

Season 14 (2015)
Ep. 1: "Ben Franklin's Bones" (2015-01-28, #1401)
Ep. 2: "JFK & LBJ: A Time for Greatness" (2015-08-04) — narrated by Morgan Freeman
Ep. 3: "The Real Trojan Horse" (2015-10-13, #1402)

Season 15 (2015–16)
Ep. 1: "Vampire Legend" (2015-10-27, #1501)
Ep. 2: "Jamestown's Dark Winter" (2015-11-24, #1403)
Ep. 3: "The Alcatraz Escape" (2016-03-29, #1503)
Ep. 4: "Cleopatra's Lost Tomb" (2016-05-17, #1502)
Ep. 5: "Teotihuacán's Lost Kings" (2016-05-24, #1504)

Season 16 (2016–17)
Ep. 1: "After Stonehenge" (2016-10-26, #1601)
Ep. 2: "Graveyard of the Giant Beasts" (2016-11-02, #1505)
Ep. 3: "Van Gogh's Ear" (2016-12-14, #1602)
EP. 4: "Nero's Sunken City" (2017-03-29)Archaeologists map the underwater ruins of Baiae, ancient Rome's version of Las Vegas
Ep. 5: "Leonardo, the Man Who Saved Science" (2017-04-05, #1604)

Season 17 (2017–19)
Special: "Secrets of Spanish Florida" (2017-12-26, #AMFC) — 2 hours
Ep. 1: "Scanning the Pyramids" (2018-01-24, #1701)
Ep. 2: "Hannibal in the Alps" (2018-04-10, #1702)A team of experts determines which of 4 possible routes was used by Hannibal
Ep. 3: "The Woman in the Iron Coffin" (2018-10-03)Forensic experts investigate the preserved remains of a young 19th century New York African American woman and reveal details of early America's free black communities.
Ep. 4: "The Nero Files" (2019-02-20, #1606)The life and legend of Nero are examined by a forensic profiler.
Ep. 5: "King Arthur's Lost Kingdom" (2019-03-27, #1703)New archaeological evidence that rewrites our understanding of 5th and 6th century Britain might also explain the legend of King Arthur.
Ep. 6: "Egypt's Darkest Hour" (2019-04-03, #1704)The discovery of a rare mass grave with the bones of nearly 60 people outside Luxor sends archaeologists on a quest to find out who the remains belong to, why they were buried the way they were and what was happening in ancient Egypt that would have led to a mass burial.
Ep. 7: "World War Speed" (2019-06-25, #1705)Historian James Holland, on his quest to understand how the use of amphetamines affected the course of World War II and unleashed “the world's first pharmacological arms race.” Shown in the UK on BBC Four as a standalone, Aug 29, 2019.

Season 18 (2019–2020)
Ep. 1: "Galileo's Moon" (2019-07-02, #1801)When it was published in 1610, Galileo's Sidereus Nuncius (Starry Messenger) set in motion a scientific revolution.
Ep. 2: "Bombing Auschwitz" (2020-01-21, #1802)On December 3, 1944, The Washington Post published an editorial on the atrocities in Auschwitz with the headline “Genocide,” marking the first time the word appeared in a national newspaper.
Ep. 3: "Building Notre Dame" (2020-04-28, #1803)An in-depth investigation is made into the centuries-long construction of Notre Dame de Paris.
Ep. 4: "Viking Warrior Queen" (2020-07-07)An examination of Birka's grave Bj 581 reveals that the remains of the warrior buried inside are female.
Ep. 5: "Abandoning the Titanic" (2020-11-04)Weighs the evidence concerning the "mystery" ship seen from the deck of the sinking Titanic
Ep. 6: "Gangster's Gold" (2020-11-18)In New York City, treasure hunters look for the trunk of money and diamonds buried by gangster Dutch Schultz in 1935.

Season 19 (2021)
Ep. 1: "Magellan's Crossing" (2021-10-20, #1901)
Ep. 2: "Lady Sapiens" (2021-10-27, #1902)
Ep. 3: "The First Circle of Stonehenge" (2021-11-03, #1903)
Ep. 4: "Hindenburg's Fatal Flaws" (2021-11-10, #1904)
Ep. 5: "A Samurai in the Vatican" (2021-11-17, #1905)
Ep. 6: "The Caravaggio Heist" (2021-11-24, #1906)

Season 20 (2022)
Ep. 1: "Archaeology at Althorp" (2022-10-09)
Ep. 2: "Last Days of Pompeii" (2022-10-19)
Ep. 3: "The End of the Romans" (2022-10-26)
Ep. 4: "Decoding Hieroglyphics" (2022-11-02)
Ep. 5: "Hidden in the Amazon" (2022-11-09)

References

External links 
 
 
 

Historical television series
PBS original programming
Television series by WNET
2000 American television series debuts
2000s American documentary television series
2010s American documentary television series
2020s American documentary television series